The National Elm Trial was an American volunteer effort to evaluate a range of newly developed elm cultivars as replacements for elms destroyed by Dutch elm disease. The Colorado State University College of Agricultural Sciences coordinated the trial.

The trial began in 2005, but was restricted to elm cultivars commercially available in the United States, unlike the trial conducted by Iowa State University in the 1970s which included the most recent European developments. The trial was conducted for 10 years, with annual assessments of each tree for height, diameter, crown characteristics, and fall color, as well as response to vascular diseases, canker diseases, foliar diseases, insect infestations, bark beetle infestations, and abiotic damages. Stated goals of the trial were as follows:

 Determine the growth and horticultural performance of commercially available elm cultivars resistant to Dutch elm disease in various climate regimes in the United States.
 Determine the relative disease, insect, and abiotic stress tolerance of these cultivars.
 Promote the propagation and use of elms through local, regional, and national reporting of the trial results to wholesale tree propagators and growers, retail nursery and garden center operators, landscaper designers, arborists, and the general public.

As of 2007, 19 distinct cultivars were being evaluated in regional trials taking place under the scientific supervision of Auburn University, University of California at Davis, Colorado State University, Purdue University, Iowa State University, Kansas State University, Michigan State University, University of Minnesota, Rutgers University, State University of New York, North Dakota State University, Ohio State University, Utah State University, University of Vermont, Washington State University, and West Virginia University. 

Based on the trial's final ratings, the preferred cultivars of the American elm (Ulmus americana) are ‘New Harmony’ and ‘Princeton’. The preferred cultivars of Asian elms are the Morton Arboretum introductions and ‘New Horizon’.

List of cultivars included in the trial
American Elm Ulmus americana cultivars: 'Valley Forge', 'New Harmony', 'Princeton', 'Lewis & Clark', 'Jefferson' (provided no data).
Chinese Elm Ulmus parvifolia cultivars: BSNUPF, 'Emer I', 'Emer II'. 
Japanese Elm Ulmus davidiana var. japonica cultivars: 'JFS - Bieberich', 'Prospector'.
Hybrid elm cultivars: 'Frontier', 'Homestead', 'Morton', 'Morton Glossy', 'Morton Plainsman', 'Morton Red Tip', 'Morton Stalwart', 'New Horizon', 'Patriot', 'Pioneer'.

See also 
 List of Elm cultivars, hybrids and hybrid cultivars

References

External links

Elm cultivars